Nevada State Prison (NSP) was a penitentiary located in Carson City. The prison was in continuous operation since its establishment in 1862 and was managed by the Nevada Department of Corrections. It was one of the oldest prisons still operating in the United States. The high security facility housed 219 inmates in September 2011. It was designed to hold 841 inmates and employed a staff of 211.

In the early 20th century, the prison became the sole designated facility for executions by the state of Nevada. It carried out the first death sentence by gas chamber in the United States with the execution of Gee Jon on February 8, 1924.

The state of Nevada chose to close the facility for budgetary reasons.  The prison closed its doors on May 18, 2012, with all inmates transferred to other institutions or released.

Although the prison has closed, it was still designated as the site of executions for the State of Nevada, until the current execution chamber at Ely State Prison opened in 2016.

Background

The prison was established in 1862 by the Nevada Territorial Legislature at the site of the Warm Springs Hotel, located east of Carson City in Nevada Territory. The legislature had been leasing the hotel from Abraham Curry and using the prison quarry to provide stone material for the Nevada State Capitol. In October of that year, Nevada became a state and the newly written constitution established that the Lieutenant Governor of Nevada also functioned as the ex-officio warden of the prison. The Governor, Secretary of State, and Attorney General comprise the board of prison commissioners.

In 1867, a fire destroyed the original building. In 1870, a major portion of the prison burned down and was rebuilt with inmate labor and stone from the on-site quarry.

On September 17, 1871, lieutenant governor and warden Frank Denver was seriously injured in a prison break that involved 27 inmates. 
In 1872, Denver refused to concede the prison to Pressly C. Hyman, who had been appointed the new warden under legislation that repealed that responsibility from the lieutenant governor. Governor Lewis R. Bradley sent troops in March 1873 to force Denver to surrender.

The prison was expanded in 1964 by the Northern Nevada Correctional Center.  The Nevada State Prison operated as a maximum security facility until 1989, when Ely State Prison was opened to fulfill that function.

The Bullpen 
After Nevada Governor Fred Balzar signed Assembly Bill 98 into law and legalised gambling in the state, Nevada State Prison did the unthinkable and opened a casino for inmates. Nicknamed the Bullpen, the casino was a success for three decades before it was eventually shut down.

The casino operated in a windowless solid rock room carved from natural sandstone surrounding the prison before it was moved to a larger sandstone building with walls sometime in the 1930s. During its 30-year operation, the casino offered traditional games such as blackjack, craps and poker and inmates ran the entire casino, from hosting games to organising security. Inmates also had their own currency in denominations of 5c, 10c, 25c, 50c, $1 and $5 which were used at the casino. Today, the currency is considered a collector's item.

The Bullpen's closure came after new Nevada Governor Paul Laxalt hired Carl Hocker as the prison's warden. Hocker ordered the casino to be shut down and for gambling to be replaced with more "wholesome" activities such as volleyball, ping pong and painting. The bullpen officially closed in April 1967 and the sandstone building that housed the casino was knocked down.

Executions

Prior to 2016, prisoners facing capital punishment were held at Ely State Prison and were sent to Nevada State Prison's execution chamber to be executed. In 2016, a new execution chamber was opened at Ely and the chamber at the Nevada State Prison was closed.

This prison became the state-designated facility for all hangings in 1903. In response to Mormon preferences, the Nevada State Legislature passed a statute in 1910 that became effective in January 1911, allowing condemned prisoners to choose between execution by shooting or hanging.

On May 14, 1913, Andriza Mircovich became the first and only inmate in Nevada to be executed by shooting. After warden George W. Cowing was unable to find five men to form a firing squad, a shooting machine was built to carry out Mircovich's execution. When the device arrived at the prison, Cowing no longer wanted to have any part of the execution and he resigned. Former governor Denver S. Dickerson, who had worked to reform the state prison system, was appointed the new warden.

In 1921, a bill authorizing the use of lethal gas had passed the Nevada State Legislature. Condemned murderer Gee Jon of the Hip Sing Tong criminal society became the first person to be executed by this method in the United States. Warden Dickerson sent his assistant Tom Pickett from Carson City to Los Angeles, California to personally pick up 20 pounds of lethal gas, which was contained in a mobile fumigating unit, at a cost of $700. Four guards did not want to participate in the process and resigned. Prison officials first attempted to pump poison gas directly into Gee's cell while he was sleeping, but without success because the gas leaked from the cell. A makeshift gas chamber was set up at the butcher shop of the prison. Gee was strapped onto a chair in the chamber which was eleven feet long, ten feet wide, and eight feet high. A small window next to the wooden chair allowed witnesses to look inside. Attendees included news reporters, public health officials and representatives of the U.S. Army. On the morning of February 8, 1924, the pump sprayed four pounds of hydrocyanic acid into the chamber. Because an electric heater failed, the chamber was 52 degrees fahrenheit instead of the ideal 75 degrees, causing some of the acid to form a puddle on the floor. Gee's head appeared to nod up and down for six minutes before he succumbed to the gas. The prison staff waited three hours for the remaining puddle of hydrocyanic acid to evaporate before cleaning up the chamber. Warden Dickerson reported to Nevada governor James G. Scrugham and the legislature his opinion that the use of lethal gas was impractical and that he thought execution by firing squad was still the best method of execution. Expenditures for Gee's execution totaled about $1,000, but the operating cost of the gas chamber plummeted to about 90 cents per use by 1937. Dickerson remained warden of Nevada State Prison until his death on November 28, 1925.

On October 22, 1979, convicted murderer Jesse Bishop became the first person to be executed at the prison after the state legislature reinstated the death penalty, following the lifting of a national moratorium on capital punishment. Bishop is also the last prisoner to be executed by lethal gas by the state. On December 6, 1985, serial killer Carroll Cole became the first inmate to be executed in Nevada by lethal injection. Executions continue to be carried out in the gas chamber, but on a gurney designed for lethal injection.

In 2012 the department was considering a capital improvement program that would relocate the execution chamber from Nevada State Prison to Ely State Prison. The current execution chamber at Ely opened in 2016.

Operations before closure

Nevada State Prison employed and provided vocational training for inmates in its factories, which produced mattresses and license plates. The prison manufactured all Nevada vehicle registration plates since 1928. The prison industries also included a bookbindery and print shop. Minimum security inmates were eligible for forklift training.

Inmates were offered the opportunity to earn a GED or take collegiate courses through Western Nevada College.

After the closure of Nevada State Prison, the license plate factory was relocated to Northern Nevada Correctional Center.

Closure
In 2009, the Nevada state legislature rejected a proposal by Governor Jim Gibbons to close the prison amid a budget crisis, and instead approved the continued operation of the prison while plans to expand or construct other new prisons were delayed. In February 2010, Nevada Department of Corrections Director Howard Skolnik notified employees that the prison system faced an $880 million deficit. Prison officials recommended moving the inmates to other facilities in the state prison system and converting the site into a tourist attraction or training center. The prison closed in May 2012.

Notable inmates

Wardens

See also

List of Nevada state prisons
Nevada Department of Corrections

References

External links
Nevada State Prison Preservation Society
Nevada State Prison at the Nevada Department of Corrections (Official site)
Nevada State Prison Closure Plan Overview – Nevada Department of Corrections (July 2, 2010)

1862 establishments in Nevada Territory
2012 disestablishments in Nevada
Capital punishment in Nevada
Prisons in Nevada
National Register of Historic Places in Carson City, Nevada